In chemistry, a ladder polymer is a type of double stranded polymer with the connectivity of a ladder. In a typical one-dimensional polymer, e.g. polyethylene and polysiloxanes, the monomers form two bonds, giving a chain.  In a ladder polymer the monomers are interconnected by four bonds.  Inorganic ladder polymers are found in synthetic and natural settings. Ladder polymers are a special case of cross-linked polymers because the crosslinks exist only with pairs of chains.

According to one definition, a ladder polymer, adjacent rings have two or more atoms in common.

Organic ladder polymers
Organic ladder polymers are interesting because they can exhibit exceptional thermal stabilities and the conformation of the subunits is constrained.  Because they are less flexible, their processing can be challenging. An early example was derived from condensation of the 1,2,4,5-tetraaminobenzene with naphthalenetetracarboxylic dianhydride.

Inorganic and organometallic ladder polymers
Some polysilicates are ladder polymers.  One example is provided by the mineral tremolite.

In the area of coordination chemistry, the ladder structure is seen in some coordination polymers.  Illustrative is the polymer [CuI(2-picoline]n.  When the 2-picoline is replaced by a tertiary phosphine, it forms a tetrameric cubane-type cluster, [CuI([[PR3]]4.  In both cases, the Cu(I) centers adopt tetrahedral molecular geometry.

References

Polymer chemistry